Melvin Donald Olson (December 24, 1930 – December 15, 2001) was an American choral conductor who is known for introducing the compositions of John Rutter to the United States.

Career 
Born in Wisconsin, Olson studied at the Northwestern University and received his master's degree from Westminster Choir College. He directed, among others, the choir The Voices of Mel Olson, which was founded in 1969 and later called Master Singers, in Omaha, Nebraska.

He and his choirs are the dedicatees of several of Rutter's works. He commissioned in 1974 Gloria for The Voices of Mel Olson, which Rutter set according to his specifications. Olson traveled to the UK to discuss details with the composer, who later credited him with influencing his compositions: "Much of the credit must go to Mel Olson … because, in telling me what he was looking for in a new choral work, he was telling me what thousands of other choral directors were looking for too.” Olson commissioned Rutter to compose "I will lift up mine eyes" (Psalm 121) for his church choir and orchestra at the First United Methodist Church in Omaha, where it was first performed one day after the Gloria.

In 1976, Olson commissioned James E. Fritschel to write Give Ear, O Ye Heavens, after Deuteronomy 32:1 for unaccompanied double chorus, for The Voices of Mel Olson. Rutter dedicated his anthem The Lord is my Shepherd (Psalm 23, published in 1978), to Olson and his Chancel Choir of the First United Methodist Church.

Edwin R. Fissinger composed on a commission of Olson for the Voices of Mel Olson To Everything There Is A Season, after Ecclesiastes III, for soprano, mezzo-soprano, tenor, speaker and choir, published in 1979 by Jenson Publications. Olson died in Nevada City, California.

References

External links 
 Loann Scarpato: John Rutter (b.1945): Gloria academyconcerts.org 3 December 2013
 John Rutter Naxos 2011

American choral conductors
American male conductors (music)
1930 births
2001 deaths
Classical musicians from Wisconsin
Northwestern University alumni
Westminster Choir College alumni
20th-century American conductors (music)
20th-century American male musicians